The North Ossetian Autonomous Oblast existed from 1924 until 1936. It became the North Ossetian Autonomous Soviet Socialist Republic in 1936.

See also
First Secretary of the North Ossetian Communist Party
North Ossetia-Alania

References

Autonomous oblasts of the Soviet Union
North Ossetia–Alania
States and territories established in 1924
States and territories disestablished in 1936
1924 establishments in the Soviet Union
1936 disestablishments in the Soviet Union